The Nanoose First Nation, also known the Snaw-naw-as First Nation, is a First Nations government located on central Vancouver Island in southwestern British Columbia, Canada, in the vicinity of the community of Nanoose Bay. They are Coast Salish people, and one of the most northern tribes on the east side of Vancouver Island. They speak Hul’q’umi’num’, which is 1 of 3 branches of the Halkomelem dialect spoken from Nanoose to Oregon.  

The Snaw-naw-as are named after the sole survivor of a battle in the 1800’s. The name  comes from the word “Naus” which means “the way in the harbour”. There are many spelling variants of Snaw-naw-as such as Snonoose, Sno-no-was, Nuas, and Nanooa and Snuwnuwus.

The Nanoose First Nation is a member government of the Naut'sa mawt Tribal Council.

See also
Halkomelem Language

References

External links
Naut'sa mawt Tribal Council website

Coast Salish governments
Mid Vancouver Island